A Table canon is a retrograde and inverse canon meant to be placed on a table in between two musicians, who both read the same line of music in opposite directions. As both parts are included in each single line, a second line is not needed. Bach's The Musical Offering contains a table canon.

See also
Mirror canon
Crab canon

References

Polyphonic form